The women's 100 metres hurdles at the 2019 World Athletics Championships was held at the Khalifa International Stadium in Doha, Qatar, from 5 to 6 October 2019.

Summary
This event lost its defending champion when Sally Pearson retired from the sport two months earlier.  The Olympic champion Brianna McNeal disappeared quickly after twitching in her blocks before the gun and being disqualified for a false start in her heat.  Even after losing the =#4 and #6 runners in history, the final still sported the world record holder, Kendra Harrison, the season's world leader Danielle Williams with the #7 time in history set a little over two months earlier and the #16 runner in history Janeek Brown from winning the NCAA Championships 4 months earlier, the last two among three Jamaicans who made it to the final.

At the gun of the final, Harrison and Williams got out together with the lead.  In lane 9, Megan Tapper got one of the worst starts imaginable to a world championship final, stuttering to the first hurdle and hitting it.  By the second hurdle, Olympic silver medalist Nia Ali joined Harrison and Williams in the lead.  Over the next two hurdles, Ali and Williams mirrored each other as Harrison lost a few inches.  As they cleared the sixth hurdle, Williams began losing ground, as Ali pressed a definite advantage which she continued to expand over the remaining hurdles.  Harrison also went past Williams as Tobi Amusan was gaining from behind.  Ali crossed the finish line with more than a metre over Harrison.  Harrison held off Amusan to get bronze.

Ali's 12.34 winning time took a tenth of a second off her personal best, moving her from =#26 of all time to =#9 with Sharika Nelvis.  In fifth place, Andrea Vargas improved her own Costa Rican national record for the fourth time in the 2019 season.

Records
Before the competition records were as follows:

The following records were set at the competition:

Schedule
The event schedule, in local time (UTC+3), was as follows:

Results

Heats
The first four in each heat (Q) and the next four fastest (q) qualified for the semi-final.

Semi-finals
The first two in each heat (Q) and the next two fastest (q) qualified for the final.

Final
The final was started on 6 October at 20:51.

References

100 hurdles
Sprint hurdles at the World Athletics Championships